is a Japanese anime television series produced by A-1 Pictures and Aniplex and directed by Tomohiko Ito. The 13-episode anime premiered in Japan on the TV Tokyo television network on July 6, 2010 and the final episode aired on September 27, 2010. Occult Academy is the third project of Anime no Chikara. It was simulcasted by Crunchyroll an hour after the Japanese broadcast. A series of DVD/Blu-ray releases are made over six volumes. Volumes one through five each contain two episodes from the series and comes with extras, such as bonus songs sung by various voice actors for the characters. The final volume covers the last three episodes There are also four spinoff episodes, the first of which is included with the second volume.

The series' opening theme is the song  sung by Shoko Nakagawa, and its ending theme is  sung by Ayahi Takagaki.

Synopsis
Set in the year of 1999, the story revolves around the mysteries of the Waldstein Academy also known as the "Occult Academy" due to its unorthodox researches involving myths, legends and paranormal activity. The main protagonists are Maya Kumashiro, daughter of the late principal of the Academy who assumes his position and Fumiaki Uchida, a time traveler sent from the year 2012 with the mission of finding and destroying the "Nostradamus Key", an unknown item that the Nostradamus Prophecies foretold to be the cause of an alien invasion that will devastate Earth.

List of episodes

References

Lists of anime episodes